Working Woman or Working Women may refer to:

 Working woman, or women in the workforce
 Working Woman (film), a 2018 film
 Working Woman (magazine), an American magazine
 "Working Woman" (song), a 1991 song by Rob Crosby

Women's rights organisations
 Working Women United
 Working Women's Association
 Working Women's Forum
 The Women Worker

See also
Working Class Woman, an album
Working Mother, a magazine
Working Girl, a movie
Working women in Japan